William L. O'Connell Jr. (born August 20, 1933) is an American film and television actor.

Biography
O'Connell was born in Richmond, Virginia, on August 20, 1933. 

O'Connell worked often with Clint Eastwood, with whom he first appeared in the 1969 musical Paint Your Wagon. In 1972, O'Connell was cast as a nervous barber in Eastwood's second directorial effort, High Plains Drifter, released the following year. In 1976, O'Connell appeared as ferryman Sim Carstairs in The Outlaw Josey Wales, also directed by Eastwood. O'Connell's other roles include portrayals in Every Which Way But Loose and its sequel Any Which Way You Can, where he played a member of a comically inept biker gang constantly being outmatched by Eastwood.

In addition to his film career, O'Connell was very active on TV throughout the 1960s and '70s, appearing in about 50 different roles on such series such as Star Trek, Rawhide, Petticoat Junction, and Quincy, M.E.

Selected filmography

 20,000 Eyes (1961) – Appraiser (uncredited)
 Womanhunt (1962)
 The Wheeler Dealers (1963) – Paid Weeper (uncredited)
 The War Lord (1965) – Volunteer rejected by Chrysagon (uncredited)
 Do Not Disturb (1965) – Cecil Graves (uncredited)
 Way... Way Out (1966) – Ponsonby
 It's a Bikini World (1967) – McSnigg
 The Big Mouth (1967) – Psychiatrist (uncredited)
 Games (1967) – Party Guest #1
 Star Trek, in "Journey to Babel" (1967, TV series) – Thelev
 Petticoat Junction, in "All Sales Final" (1967, TV series) – Mr. Agnew
 The Sweet Ride (1968) – Beach Resident (uncredited)
 Ice Station Zebra (1968) – Survivor
 Hook, Line & Sinker (1969) – Hotel Clerk (uncredited)
 Paint Your Wagon (1969) – Horace Tabor
 The Happy Ending (1969) – Minister
 Green Acres, in "A Tale of a Tail" (1969, TV series) – Hotel Clerk
 Which Way to the Front? (1970) – Mr. Prescott (uncredited)
 Scandalous John (1971) – Men's Store Clerk
 The Culpepper Cattle Co. (1972) – Bartender in Piercetown
 High Plains Drifter (1973) – the barber
 Black Eye (1974) – Minister
 Big Bad Mama (1974) – Crusade Preacher
 The Outlaw Josey Wales (1976) – Sim Carstairs
 Every Which Way but Loose (1978) – Elmo (Black Widow)
 Any Which Way You Can (1980) – Elmo (Black Widow)
 Stewardess School (1986) – Attorney

External links
 
 William O'Connell at Hollywood.com
 William O'Connell at The Scott Rollins Film and TV Trivia Blog

1933 births
Male actors from Richmond, Virginia
Living people